Adeh may refer to:
 Adeh, Naqadeh
 Adeh, Urmia
 Adeh-e Mortezapasha, Urmia County